Alan John McConnell (born 30 March 1957) is a former Australian rules footballer who played for Footscray in the Victorian Football League (VFL) during the early 1980s and later coached Fitzroy. McConnell is currently serving as director of coaching at the Greater Western Sydney Giants.

Playing career
Originally from Kolora in the Mount Noorat Football League, Alan played with Terang in the Hampden Football League, under age football with Fitzroy and Victorian Football Association (VFA) football with Preston,

Footscray
McConnell was a fierce defender at Footscray Football Club in the VFL league and spent three seasons with the club from 1980 until 1982, playing a total of 37 games and kicked 5 goals.

Coaching career

Fitzroy Football Club caretaker senior coach (1995), (1996)
In 1995, he was appointed as the caretaker senior coach of Fitzroy when Bernie Quinlan was sacked during the season. He again became the caretaker senior coach of Fitzroy, in the following year in the 1996 season for the last eight games when senior coach Michael Nunan stood aside, but he failed to register a win in either season. McConnell then became the last official senior coach of Fitzroy Football Club. McConnell left Fitzroy after the 1996 season, when the Fitzroy Football Club merged with Brisbane Bears to become the newly formed Brisbane Lions Football Club.

Geelong Football Club
McConnell then joined Geelong as an assistant coach.

Australian Institute of Sport
After leaving Geelong, he became the head AFL coach for the Australian Institute of Sport.

GWS Giants
McConnell later became the first appointment to the Greater Western Sydney Giants as an assistant coach working with the forward line in 2013, McConnell then later became the GWS Director of Coaching under GWS senior coach Leon Cameron. McConnell was appointed the senior coach of the Giants' AFL Women's side in July 2017. Thus becoming the first person to coach both an AFL and AFLW side. In the round three, 2018 match against , McConnell registered his first win in his entire coaching career, having endured eleven losses from as many matches during his two stints as 's caretaker senior coach in 1995 and 1996. On 26 March 2022, it was announced that McConnell would step down from his role as senior coach of the Giants' AFL Women's side at the end of the 2022 season and move into another role within in the club. However on 12 April 2022, McConnell reversed this decision and stepped down early from his role as senior coach GWS AFL Women's side effective immediately and was replaced by Cameron Bernasconi.

References

Holmesby, Russell and Main, Jim (2007). The Encyclopedia of AFL Footballers. 7th ed. Melbourne: Bas Publishing.

External links

1957 births
Living people
Australian rules footballers from Victoria (Australia)
Western Bulldogs players
Preston Football Club (VFA) players
Fitzroy Football Club coaches
Greater Western Sydney Giants
AFL Women's coaches